Villiers High School is a co-educational 11–18 school and sixth form in the Southall area of the west London borough of Ealing. The school is situated in Boyd Avenue, in the heart of Southall. Aruna Sharma was appointed Headteacher in September 2017. as of 2022 it has around 1,500 pupils on roll, 250 of whom are in the sixth form.

The local authority, the London Borough of Ealing, administers the Co-ordinated High School Admissions Scheme, for Villiers High School.

History
The school first opened as Southall County School in 1907. It changed its name to Southall Grammar in 1945. In 1963 the school merged with Southall College of Technology (a boys' technical school, which had been located in Beaconsfield Road) and was renamed Southall Grammar Technical School. The name was changed to Villiers High School in 1974. The sixth-form opened in 2009.

Ofsted
After inspections which rated the school as Satisfactory in 2007 and Requires Improvement in 2010, the school was rated Good in all areas in spring 2015 following an Ofsted inspection. The report found the school is "rapidly improving" under "very strong" leadership of the senior leadership team.

The school was described as "a harmonious community characterised by mutual respect and high aspirations".

Notable teaching staff
In 2008, David Onllwyn Jones, an assistant head teacher at the school, was made Member of the Order of the British Empire for his services to education.

Notable former pupils
 Imran Qayyum, cricketer for Kent County Cricket Club
 Wassi Singh, future millionaire
 Karanpreet Singh, worst lanyard wearer 
 Sanaja Sivakumar, active Tamil Tiger member

Southall Grammar Technical School
 Alan Charles, Derbyshire Police and Crime Commissioner from 2012–16
 Chris Highton, presenter on BBC Radio Leicester (1960–68)
 Stephen Harrison FCCA Finance Director, Duffy Group plc 
 Prof John Woodhouse FRS, Professor of Geophysics from 1990–2014 at the University of Oxford, and Head from 2000–03 and 2011-12 of the Department of Earth Sciences; winner of the Gold Medal of the Royal Astronomical Society in 2010, the Inge Lehmann Medal in 2001, and the James B. Macelwane Medal in 1984

Southall Grammar School
 Dennis Amy CMG OBE, Ambassador to the Democratic Republic of Madagascar from 1990–92
 Ray Dorset, singer with Mungo Jerry
 Doug Hayward, tailor
 Ronald Peter Nash CMG LVO, High Commissioner to Trinidad and Tobago from 2004–07, and Ambassador to Afghanistan from 2002–03
 Barry Price CBE, Chief Constable from 1980-87 of Cumbria Constabulary
 Allan Segal, documentary television film-maker for World in Action

Colin FieldBsc Msc Phd FIP FRIB [Emeritus Professor University of Technology Sydney Australia, Professor and Associate Director( Academic) City University Hong Kong 1988-1993

Southall County School
 Barry Foster (actor), known in the early 1970s for Thames Television's Van der Valk
 Sir Leslie Murphy, Chairman from 1977-79 of the National Enterprise Board
 Prof Ronald Ottewill OBE FRS FRSC, Leverhulme Professor of Physical Chemistry from 1982–92 and Professor of Colloid Science from 1970–82 at the University of Bristol, President from 1989-91 of the Faraday Society
 Lionel Robbins, Baron Robbins of Clare Market CH CB, economist at the LSE who wrote An Essay on the Nature and Significance of Economic Science; his famous Robbins Report led to expansion of universities in the 1960s, from the former Colleges of Technology, and the creation of the Council for National Academic Awards (CNAA, which awarded degrees to polytechnics)
 Sydney Templeman, Baron Templeman, one of the Lords of Appeal in Ordinary from 1982–94, President from 1974-76 of the Senate of the Inns of Court and the Bar (now the Bar Standards Board)
 Elsie Whetnall, philosopher
 Archibald Willett, Managing Director from 1973-77 of Cable & Wireless Ltd

References

Secondary schools in the London Borough of Ealing
Foundation schools in the London Borough of Ealing
Educational institutions established in 1907
1907 establishments in England